The 2013–14 season, was the nineteenth Torneo Argentino A season since it became part of the third tier of the Argentine football league system. The tournament is reserved for teams indirectly affiliated to the Asociación del Fútbol Argentino (AFA), while teams affiliated to AFA  have to play the Primera B Metropolitana, which is the other third tier competition. The champion will be promoted to Primera B Nacional.

The regular season began on August 16, 2013 and was scheduled to end on June 7, 2014.
A total of 24 teams competed with 20 of them remaining from the 2012–13 season. They were joined by four teams promoted from 2012–13 Torneo Argentino B.

Club information

North Zone

South Zone

1 Play their home games at Estadio José María Minella.

Geographical distribution

First stage
The teams were divided into two zones, North and South, all of which went to the Second Stage: the first four of each zone and the fifth best team of both zones qualified to the "Nonagonal Final", and the other teams qualified to Revalida Stage.

North Zone

Results

South Zone

Results

Second stage

Nonagonal Final
It consisted of nine teams that qualified from the First Stage (4 from the North Zone and 5 from the South Zone). The winner was promoted to the Primera B Nacional. It was played in a round-robin system. The 2 and 3 team advanced directly to the Fourth Stage, while the 4th to the 9th advanced to the Third Stage.

Results

Reválida Stage
The fifteen clubs that did not qualify for the Nonagonal Final were grouped into three zones of five teams each. To integrate the zones a table was drawn with the fifteen clubs and its overall standings with points obtained in the First Stage. Teams in position 1,6,7,12,15 went to Zone A; teams in position 2,5,8,11,14 went to Zone B and teams in position 3,4,9,10,13 went to Zone C.

Zone A

Results

Overall standings
Addition of points of First Stage and Reválida Stage.

Zone B

Results

Overall standings
Addition of points of First Stage and Reválida Stage.

Zone C

Results

Overall standings
Addition of points of First Stage and Reválida Stage.

Tiebreaker

Third to Sixth stage
Was played by the teams ranked 2nd to 9th in the Nonagonal Final and the teams that qualified from Revalida Stage. To order the matches a table was drawn which contained the teams  from the Nonagonal Final and the teams  from the Revalida numbering them from 2º to 15º (teams from Nonagonal Final were 2º to 9º and teams from Revalida were 10º to º15).

From Nonagonal Final

From Revalida

Third stage
This Stage was played by the teams in position 4º to 9º from the Nonagonal Final and the teams from the Revalida. The winning teams qualify for Fourth Stage. In case of a tie the teams from position 4º to 9º qualified for the next stage (teams of the left column).

1: Qualified because of sport advantage.

Bracket

Note: The team in the first line plays at home the second leg.

Fourth stage
This Stage was played by the teams ranked 2º and 3º Nonagonal Final and the teams that qualified from the Third Stage. In case of a tie the teams from position 2º, 3º, W1 and W2 qualified for the next stage (teams of the left column).

1: Qualified because of sport advantage.

Fifth stage
This Stage was played by the teams that qualified from the Fourth Stage. The matches will be W1 vs W4 and W2 vs W3. In case of a tie, W1 and W2 qualified for the next stage (teams of the left column).

1: Qualified because of sport advantage.

Sixth stage
This Stage was played by the teams that qualified from the Fifth Stage, W1 vs W2. The winning team will be promoted to Primera B Nacional. In case of a tie, W1 was promoted (team of the left column).

1: Promoted because of sport advantage.

Season statistics

Top scorers

See also
2013–14 in Argentine football

References

External links
 Sitio Oficial de AFA   
 Ascenso del Interior  
 Interior Futbolero  
 Mundo Ascenso  
 RSSSF
 Solo Ascenso  
 Torneo Argentino A  
 Torneos Argentinos  

3
Torneo Argentino A seasons